The Tahan River is a river that flows through Taman Negara in Malaysia. A popular hiking destination, it is generally accessed from a trail beginning at Kuala Tahan.

See also
 List of rivers of Malaysia

References

Rivers of Pahang
Rivers of Malaysia